The Tyne, Trent and Tors gas fields are depleted natural gas reservoirs and former gas production facilities in the southern North Sea, centred around the Trent installation about 115 km east of Flamborough Head, Yorkshire. The fields produced gas from 1996 to 2020.

The fields 
The Tyne, Trent and Tors (Kilmar and Garrow) gas fields are located in UK Offshore Blocks 44/18a, 43/24, 43/22a, 42/25a and 43/21a. Tyne and Trent are named after English rivers that flow into the North Sea. Kilmar and Garrow are named after Tors in Cornwall, and together were referred to as the Tors development. The gas reservoirs have the following characteristics.

Development 
The Tyne, Trent, Kilmar and Garrow gas fields were developed over the period 1996 to 2008. Gas was produced by five offshore installations, detailed in the table.   

Gas export from Trent reused the 24” Esmond to Bacton pipeline (Esmond Transmission System) to the Bacton gas terminal, also known as EAGLES East Anglia Gas and Liquids Evacuation System pipeline.

Production 
On the Tyne installation fluids from the wellheads were routed to the 3-phase Production Separator. The gas and condensate streams were metered then cojoined and sent to the pipeline to Trent. Separated water was metered and passed to the Produced Water Filter before disposal overboard.

On Trent the fluids from Tyne were routed to a slug catcher then comingled with Trent gas from the Trent Production Separator. The combined gas stream was routed across the bridge to the TC platform. Here it passed successively to a Separator, LP Compressor, Cooler, Separator, HP Compressor, Cooler and Discharge Scrubber. The gas stream was routed back to the Production platform. Here it was dried by counter current contact with Tri-Ethylene Glycol before being sent to Bacton.

An outline of the gas production from the fields is summarised in the table.

The production profile, in mcm/y, of the Trent field was as shown.

Decommissioning 
Perenco submitted a Decommissioning Programme for the Tyne installation to the UK Oil & Gas Authority in 2018. This will entail plugging and abandoning the wells and removal of all structures above the sea bed. Following shutdown of the Trent platform in 2020 Alpha Petroleum announced the Kilmar and Garrow would be shutdown.

Since 2016 gas from the Cygnus A complex has been routed via a 55 km 24" export pipeline to a tie-in on the Esmond Transmission System (ETS) and then to Bacton.

See also 

 Bacton gas terminal 
 List of oil and gas fields of the North Sea 
 Esmond, Forbes and Gordon gas fields

References 

Natural gas fields in the United Kingdom
North Sea energy